Laboratorio 1 is the fifth compilation album by Italian DJ Gigi D'Agostino, released in September 2004 through NoiseMaker / Media Records.

Track listing
 Molto Folk - "Canto Do Mar" [Gigi D'Agostino Pescatore Mix]
 Gigi D'Agostino - "Complex" [Breve Ma Intenso]
 DJ Pandolfi - "Main Title/The Kiss" [Gigi D'Agostino & Pandolfi Mix]
 Elettrogang - "Once Upon a Time"
 Luca Noise - "Traffico" [Gigi D'Agostino & Luca Noise Mix]
 Gigi D'Agostino - "The Rain" [Gigi D'Agostino & Pandolfi Mix]
 Limmatstreet  - "Precious Little Diamond"
 Gigi D'Agostino - "Sonata" [Cantando Ballando]
 La Tana Del Suono - "Nascendo"
 Gigi D'Agostino - "Voyage"
 Molto Folk - "Love"

References

Gigi D'Agostino albums

hu:Benessere 1